Geneviève Billette  is a Quebec writer and translator.

She was born in Quebec City and received a BA from the Université de Montréal. Billette went on to study at the National Theatre School of Canada. She has written radio plays for Radio Canada. She was writer in residence for Théâtre Carrousel and at the Festival International des Théâtres Francophones in Limoges, France. Billette has also translated plays by several Mexican playwrights into French. Her work has been performed in France, in Mexico and in Switzerland.

Selected works 
 Crime contre l'humanité (1999), shortlisted for the Governor General's Award for French-language drama; translated into English as Crime Against Humanity
 Le Goûteur (2002)
 Le Pays des genoux, received the Governor General's Award for French-language drama, the Prix Paul-Gilson and the Prix Gratien-Gélinas
 Les ours dorment enfin (2010), shortlisted for the Governor General's Award and received the Prix Annick-Lansman
 Contre le temps (2012), received the Governor General's Award

References 

Living people
Canadian dramatists and playwrights in French
Governor General's Award-winning dramatists
Canadian women dramatists and playwrights
20th-century Canadian dramatists and playwrights
20th-century Canadian women writers
21st-century Canadian dramatists and playwrights
21st-century Canadian translators
21st-century Canadian women writers
Writers from Quebec City
Université de Montréal alumni
National Theatre School of Canada alumni
20th-century Canadian translators
Canadian women non-fiction writers
Year of birth missing (living people)